Sangsan Lee clan is one of the Korean clans. Their Bon-gwan is in Sangju, North Gyeongsang Province. According to the research held in 2000, the number of Sangsan Lee clan was 1379. His descendant founded Sangsan Lee clan and made their Bon-gwan Sangju.

See also 
 Korean clan names of foreign origin

References

External links 
 

 
Korean clan names of Chinese origin
Yi clans